Below is a list of  nominations and appointments to the Department of State by Joe Biden, the 46th president of the United States. , according to tracking by The Washington Post and Partnership for Public Service, 41 nominees have been confirmed, 7 nominees are being considered by the Senate, 5 positions do not have nominees, and 16 appointments have been made to positions that don't require Senate confirmation.

Color key 
 Denotes appointees awaiting Senate confirmation.

 Denotes appointees serving in an acting capacity.

 Denotes appointees who have left office or offices which have been disbanded.

Secretary & Deputy Secretaries

Office of Political Affairs

Office of Arms Control and International Security

Office of Civilian Security, Democracy and Human Rights

Office of Economic Growth, Energy, and the Environment

Office of Management

Office of Public Diplomacy and Public Affairs

J. William Fulbright Foreign Scholarship Board

Office of the Secretary & Deputy Secretaries

United States Mission to the United Nations 

This list contains the non-ambassadorial appointments made within the scope of the U.S. Mission to the United Nations.

Other offices

Withdrawn nominations

See also 
 Cabinet of Joe Biden, for the vetting process undergone by top-level roles including advice and consent by the Senate
 List of executive branch 'czars' e.g. Special Advisor to the President
 List of all Assistant Secretary of State roles within the U.S. Department of State
 List of all Under Secretary of State roles within the U.S. Department of State

Notes 

Confirmations by roll call vote

Confirmations by voice vote

References 

 Biden
State